Harry Duncan McGowan, 1st Baron McGowan KBE (3 June 1874 – 13 July 1961) LLD DCL, was a prominent British industrialist who served as Chairman of Imperial Chemical Industries for 20 years.

Early life and education
McGowan was the only son of Henry McGowan Esq. and his wife Agnes (née Wilson). He was educated at Hutchesons' Grammar School, an independent school in Glasgow and Allan Glen's School. He joined the Nobel Explosives Company, the company founded by Alfred Nobel, as an executive officer. In 1918 he became Chairman and Managing Director of Explosives Trade Ltd (from 1920 known as Nobel Industries Ltd), a position he held until the formation of ICI.

Business career
In 1926 Nobel Industries merged with Brunner Mond, the United Alkali Company and the British Dyestuffs Corporation to form Imperial Chemical Industries (ICI). The merger, orchestrated by Alfred Mond, 1st Baron Melchett and McGowan, created one of the world's largest industrial corporations at the time. McGowan succeeded Lord Melchett as Chairman and Managing Director in 1930 and remained Chairman until 1950. McGowan was appointed a KBE in the 1918 Birthday Honours and on 24 February 1937 he was raised to the peerage as Baron McGowan, of Ardeer in the County of Ayr, following the 1937 New Year Honours.

Lord McGowan married Jean, daughter of William Young, in 1903. They had two sons and two daughters. He died in July 1961, aged 87, and was succeeded in the barony by his elder son Harry.

Arms

References

 Oxbury, Harold. Great Britons: Twentieth Century Lives. Promotional Reprint Company, 1993.
 Kidd, Charles, Williamson, David (editors). Debrett's Peerage and Baronetage (1990 edition). New York: St Martin's Press, 1990.

External links
 

1874 births
1961 deaths
Imperial Chemical Industries executives
People educated at Allan Glen's School
Scottish businesspeople
Knights Commander of the Order of the British Empire
Businesspeople from Glasgow
Barons created by George VI